Kahalgaon Super Thermal Power Station (KhSTPP)is located in Kahalgaon in Bhagalpur district of Bihar. The power plant is one of the coal based power plants of NTPC. The coal for the power plant is sourced from Rajmahal coalfield of Eastern Coalfields Limited. Source of water for the power plant is Ganga River.

Capacity 
The work of NTPC Super Thermal Power Plant in Kahalgaon started in 1985. In March 1992, the first unit of 210 MW capacity was commissioned. Gradually, its capacity was increased. The total installed capacity of the plant is 2,340 MW. In the plant,  of coal is used daily for power generation, which is supplied from the Rajmahal coalfield in Jharkhand. Nearly 65 lakh tons of fly ash comes out of the plant every year. Fly ash contains silica, alumina, mercury and iron.

References

External links

 NTPC Kahalgaon

Coal-fired power stations in Bihar
Bhagalpur district
Energy infrastructure completed in 1992
Energy infrastructure completed in 2007
1992 establishments in Bihar